Ruslan Platon (born 12 January 1982, in Sniachiv, Chernivtsi Oblast) is a professional Ukrainian football forward who plays for TSK Simferopol.

Career
He played the second half of the 2007/2008 season on loan at FC Zakarpattia Uzhhorod, and returned to play for Kharkiv next season. In 2009 July, he signed for Tavriya Simferopol. He played for Metalurh Zaporizhya in the Ukrainian First League.

References

External links
 Profile on Official Kharkiv Website
 
 
 

1982 births
Living people
Ukrainian footballers
Ukrainian footballers banned from domestic competitions
Association football forwards
FC Karpaty Lviv players
Ukrainian Premier League players
Ukrainian First League players
Ukrainian Second League players
FC Kharkiv players
FC Hoverla Uzhhorod players
SC Tavriya Simferopol players
FC Bukovyna Chernivtsi players
FC Metalurh Zaporizhzhia players
FC TSK Simferopol players
Crimean Premier League players
Sportspeople from Chernivtsi Oblast